Club Deportivo Liberal Ismael Rodríguez are a Salvadoran professional football club based in San Miguel, El Salvador.

The club currently plays in the Salvadoran Third Division.

Football clubs in El Salvador